Norbaeocystin is a psilocybin mushroom alkaloid and analog of psilocybin. It is found as a minor compound in most psilocybin mushrooms together with psilocin, psilocybin, aeruginascin, and baeocystin, from which it is a derivative.

Norbaeocystin is a N-demethylated derivative of baeocystin (itself a N-demethylated derivative of psilocybin), and a phosphorylated derivative of 4-hydroxytryptamine. The latter is notable as a positional isomer of serotonin, which is 5-hydroxytryptamine.

See also 
 Aeruginascin
 Baeocystin
 Norpsilocin
 Psilocybin

References 

Tryptamine alkaloids
Organophosphates
Psychedelic tryptamines